Headingley Cricket Ground is a cricket venue that exists as part of the Headingley Stadium complex in Leeds, England. It was established in 1890 and currently has a capacity of 17,000. The ground has hosted 78 Test matches, the first of these was played in 1899 between England and Australia. Headingley has also staged 45 One Day Internationals (ODIs), the first of which was played between England and the West Indies in 1973.

The first of 114 Test centuries made at the ground was scored by the Englishman Stanley Jackson against Australia in 1905. The Australian Donald Bradman holds the record for the highest Test innings at Headingley. Bradman's innings of 334 not out, scored in 1930, was also the highest of his Test career. Bradman made a second triple century at Headingley when he scored 304 in 1934. The only other player to score a triple century at the ground is the Englishman John Edrich who made 310 not out against New Zealand in 1965. Geoffrey Boycott and Donald Bradman are the only players to have scored four Test centuries at Headingley. The West Indies' Shai Hope is the only batsman to score centuries in each innings of a Test. No player had managed this in any previous first-class match at the ground.

Nineteen ODI centuries have been scored at the ground, the first was by the Australian Graeme Wood in 1981. The Sri Lankan Sanath Jayasuriya holds the record for the highest ODI innings at the ground. Jayasuriya scored 152 from 99 deliveries against England in 2006. The highest score by an Englishman is 128 which was made by Robin Smith in 1990.

Key
 * denotes that the batsman was not out.
 Inns. denotes the number of the innings in the match.
 Balls denotes the number of balls faced in an innings.
 NR denotes that the number of balls was not recorded.
 Parentheses next to the player's score denotes his century number at Headingley.
 The column title Date refers to the date the match started.
 The column title Result refers to whether the player's team won, lost or if the match was drawn.

List of centuries

Test centuries
The following table summarises the Test centuries scored at Headingley.

One Day International centuries

The following table summarises the One Day International centuries scored at Headingley.

References 

Hedaingley
Centuries
Centuries
Centuries